Allobaccha bequaerti is a species of hoverfly.

Distribution
Cameroun.

References

Syrphini
Insects described in 1929
Diptera of Africa